The men's 50 kilometres walk event at the 1999 Pan American Games was held on July 29.

Results

References

Athletics at the 1999 Pan American Games
1999